North Thurston High School, located in the North Thurston Public Schools District in Lacey, Washington, is a comprehensive high school which opened in 1955.  North Thurston serves a portion of Lacey and northeast Thurston County.  The school is accredited by the Washington State Superintendent of Public Instruction. The principal is Nick Greenwell.

Facility 
The current North Thurston High School campus was constructed in 1983; South Sound Stadium was added in 1985 and the Auditorium was added in 1995.  NTHS' central building easily hit capacity within the first few years after being constructed. A flood of portables were brought in during the mid 80's to handle the student enrollment growth along with the 1993 construction of River Ridge High School.  Several portables are still in use to handle the over-capacity demand on the NTHS campus.

The original North Thurston High School campus used to be located on what is now the student parking lot.  This campus was constructed in 1954 and torn down in 1984.  The old campus hosted Chinook Middle School students during the 1983-1984 year while Chinook's building went through a building remodel.  Three original building from the old NTHS campus;  NTPS' Bower Learning Center (the old high school library), the auto shop, and the school swimming pool were part of the old high school campus and are still in use.  With the exception of the auto shop building,  the pool and Bower Learning Center were recently remodeled in 2003.

As of 2011, a re-modernization project to remodel the 27-year-old North Thurston High School building is currently under development by North Thurston Public Schools and awaits funding.  The project would take place in various yearly stages with students on campus.   Some ideas being considered are a new gymnasium with expanded capacity, expansion of the current commons area into the current gymnasium, increased parking, additional building expansion to replace 27 portables, and modernization and safety upgrades of current classroom, hallway, and unused spaces.

History
On April 27, 2015, a 16-year-old male student at the school fired twice in the crowded high school commons before a teacher, who was a military veteran, grabbed him. The Lacey police officer on duty at the school had not been able to fire because students were in his line of fire and the teacher reached the shooter before the officer thought he could get a clear shot at the shooter. The shooter said he never wanted to hurt any students, but fired his gun only to get the school resource officer to him.

Notable alumni 

 Jason Dunn, class of '90, former professional soccer player with 3 caps for the USMNT
 Darcy Fast, class of '65, Former MLB player (Chicago Cubs)
 Gabriel Gudding, class of '84, poet and essayist, translator 
 Kasey Keller, class of '88, US National Soccer team goalkeeper in 1990, 1998, 2002 and 2006 World Cup tournaments, former Goalie for Seattle Sounders FC. A street near North Thurston is named after him.
 Brian Kendrick, class of '97, Professional wrestler
 Michael Sellers, class of '93, a retired NFL Pro-bowler (2008), formerly with the Washington Redskins
 Gary Wright, class of '64, anti-Vietnam War protester who emigrated to Canada and became mayor of New Denver, British Columbia

Sports
North Thurston High School is a 3A-division member of the Washington Interscholastic Activities Association. It is a member of the Narrows League, which includes a combination of 4A and 3A schools. 

State Championships, 2nd place:

Baseball - 1976, 1987; Boys Soccer - 1985; Girls Swimming - 1984; Boys Tennis - 1987; Boys Track and Field - 1987; Girls Track and Field - 1994; Volleyball - 2012

See also
River Ridge High School
Timberline High School

References

External links 
 North Thurston High School website

Educational institutions established in 1955
High schools in Thurston County, Washington
Public high schools in Washington (state)
Schools in Lacey, Washington
1955 establishments in Washington (state)